"Humnava Mere" is 2018 Hindi language single. The ballad is sung by Indian playback singer Jubin Nautiyal. The song is composed by the musical duo Rocky & Shiv and lyrics written by Manoj Muntashir. It is presented by Gulshan Kumar and produced by Bhushan Kumar, under the label of T-Series.

Release 
Official music released on 22 May 2018 by T-Series on YouTube. While, lyrical video was released on 27 May 2018. Same as, audio version was out on 28 May 2018. It garnered over 36 million views in its first month of release. Lyrical video has gained over 15 million YouTube views as of August 2020. Official music video has received more than 360 million views as of August 2020.

Director Ashish Panda said that he preferred the song over video and seek guidance from lyrics and music. He added that they had 2 days in Venice and a crew of 6 people. They rehearsed it in India and working with Jubin was pleasure.

Jubin said that it is sad song and is about unrequited love that has been felt by us in some lives' stages. He further added that he was introduced to this song 3 years earlier and it took more than expected time. It's very special song. Bhushan said that Jubin's fans would love this song and it would help him to earn new fans.

Music video 
The music video is directed by Ashish Panda. It has been shot in Venice. It features Jubin Nautiyal & Romika Sharma. In the beginning, Jubin (Raj in video) is seen drawing a sketch of female while sitting on a boat. Suddenly, he sees the same girl as of sketch. They switch to a flashback where Raj and the girl are dating. One fine day, the girl comes to Raj and shows her engagement ring and they both break up, though Raj still loves her. 
They come back to the present where Raj is depressed and sketching when he sees the same girl wandering in Venice. He recognizes her as her beloved. They two also do the boating. At the end, she runs and Jubin start chasing her. She reaches her husband who was finding her. She points towards Jubin saying that he's Raj. However, her husband comes near Jubin and apologizes saying that she's mentally unwell and keeps calling Raj all times. He doesn't know who 'that Raj' is. Finally, Raj leaves and a depressing tune of 'Humnava Mere' is sung.

Credits

Main credits 
 Song – Humnava Mere
 Singer – Jubin Nautiyal
 Music – Rocky – Shiv 
 Lyrics – Manoj Muntashir
 Music Label – T-Series

Audio credits 
 Song producer – Aditya Dev
 Electric guitar and banjo – Appai Prachotosh Bhowmick
 Flute – Tejas 
 Recorded at Songbird Studios by Anish Gohil
 Mixed and mastered by Eric Pillai

Cover version 

The cover version of the song is sung by Jubin Nautiyal and Amrita Nayak. Cover version was released on 23 August 2018 by T-Series and it has garnered over 7 million views on YouTube as of August 2020.

Credits 
 Song – Humnava Mere
 Singer – Jubin Nautiyal & Amrita Nayak
 Video Editor – Vivek Shevade
 DOP – Vaibbhav Budhiraja
 Camera – Kumar Gaurav

Acoustic version 

The acoustic version was sung by Jubin Nautiyal. It released on 27 November 2018 by T-Series. Jubin Nautiyal said that after making acoustic version of 'Akh Lad Jaave', he received lot of requests from his fans, therefore, he also made an acoustic version of 'Humnava Mere' and paid gratitude to his fans. Guitar and Piano has been used in this song. It has gained 1.5 million views on YouTube as of August 2020.

Credits

Main credits 
 Song – Humnava Mere 
 Version – Acoustic Version
 Singer – Jubin Nautiyal
 Music – Rocky Shiv
 Lyrics – Manoj Muntashir

Audio credits 
 Piano – Aditya Dev
 Guitar – Mohit Dogra
 Mix & Master – Aditya Dev

Video credits 
 Director: Rocky Khanna
 DOP – Dhiru Bhist
 Editor – Mohan Rathod
 DI Colorist – Manoj Singh
 Production Manager – Manish Joshi

Track listings

Release history

References

External links 

Jubin Nautiyal songs
2018 songs
Hindi-language songs
Songs with lyrics by Manoj Muntashir
T-Series (company) singles